Gentlemen Prefer Blondes may refer to:

Gentlemen Prefer Blondes (novel), a 1925 novel by Anita Loos
Gentlemen Prefer Blondes (1928 film), a silent film adaptation of the novel, presumed lost, starring Ruth Taylor
Gentlemen Prefer Blondes (musical), the 1949 stage musical based on the novel, starring Carol Channing
Gentlemen Prefer Blondes (1953 film), a film adaptation of the stage musical, starring Jane Russell and Marilyn Monroe
"Gentlemen Prefer Blondes", a song by Irving Berlin

See also
But Gentlemen Marry Brunettes, the sequel to the novel
Gentlemen Marry Brunettes, the sequel to the 1953 film
"Diamonds Are a Girl's Best Friend" (1949 song)
"Material Girl" (1984 song)